The men's 500 m time trial at the 2011 Dutch National Track Championships in Apeldoorn took place at Omnisport Apeldoorn on December 29, 2011. 19 athletes participated in the contest.

Teun Mulder won the gold medal, Matthijs Büchli took silver and Yondi Schmidt won the bronze.

Results

Results from uci.ch.

References

2011 Dutch National track cycling championships
Track cycling